Diphtheritic stomatitis is a recently discovered disease and has thus far been reported only in Yellow-eyed penguins (Megadyptes antipodes). Its symptoms are similar to human diphtheria and is characterized by infectious lesions in the mouth area that impede swallowing and cause respiratory troubles. The infection is caused by Corynebacterium amycolatum, an aerobic Gram-positive bacterium and mainly affects very young chicks. However, it seems likely that a triggering agent (e.g. a virus) might be involved in which renders the corynebacterium a secondary pathogen.

The disease has been a serious cause of mortality in the 2002 and 2004 Yellow-eyed penguin breeding seasons. It seems that only the New Zealand South Island and Stewart Island/Rakiura were affected.

Signs and symptoms
 Almost exclusively seen in Yellow-eyed penguin chicks
 Heavy breathing and signs of weakness
 Yellow caesious exudate within the beak and at the commissures of the mouth
 Yellow diphtheritic membrane covers the hard palate, tongue and buccal mucosa
 Mouth can often not be closed due to lesions, in serious cases tongue exposed

Diagnosis
 Isolation of Corynebacterium amycolatum from a clinical specimen, or
 Histopathologic diagnosis of diphtheria

Treatment
During the latest outbreak of the disease (2004), several treatment methods were tested. Main treatment involved the administration of antibiotics, in some cases glucose solution or dietary mixtures were additionally supplemented. Outcome of the different treatment methods varied greatly. Especially the success of antibiotic treatment and a widespread use on wild animals remains a matter of debate.

Sources
 Summarized from Minutes of "Yellow-eyed Penguin Corynebacterium Workshop" held in Dunedin, Tuesday 5 April 2005

Bacterial diseases
Bird diseases